John Arthur Elston (February 10, 1874 – December 15, 1921) was a U.S. Representative from California.

Born in Woodland, California, Elston attended public schools.
He graduated from Hesperian College, Woodland, 1892.
He graduated from the University of California, Berkeley, California, 1897.
He was a teacher.
He was admitted to the California state bar, 1901, and was a lawyer in private practice.
He served as executive secretary to the Governor of California (George C. Pardee) from 1903 to 1907.
He served as member of the board of trustees of the State Institution for the Deaf and Blind from 1911 to 1914.

Elston was elected as a Progressive to the Sixty-fourth Congress and reelected as a Republican to the three succeeding Congresses (March 4, 1915 – December 15, 1921).
He served as chairman of the Committee on Mileage (Sixty-sixth Congress).

Elston committed suicide in Washington, D.C. on December 15, 1921, by drowning in the Potomac River.  He was cremated and the ashes placed in the California Crematorium, now the Chapel of the Chimes, Oakland, California.

See also 
 List of United States Congress members who died in office (1900–49)

References 

 John A. Elston, late a representative from California, Memorial addresses delivered in the House of Representatives and Senate frontispiece 1924

1874 births
1921 suicides
People from Woodland, California
Progressive Party (1912) members of the United States House of Representatives from California
Republican Party members of the United States House of Representatives from California
California lawyers
Suicides by drowning in the United States
American politicians who committed suicide
Suicides in Washington, D.C.